Thurston Creek is a stream in Lewis and Thurston counties in the U.S. state of Washington. It is a tributary to the Deschutes River.

Thurston Creek takes its name from Thurston County.

References

Rivers of Lewis County, Washington
Rivers of Thurston County, Washington
Rivers of Washington (state)